Murābiṭūn  ( murābiṭūn) or  murābiṭ may refer to
Saʿada and Murabtin, a social class among the Arabized Berber Bedouins of the Maghreb
Almoravid dynasty, a medieval Moroccan dynasty
Maravedí, a currency in medieval Spain
Marabout (marbūṭ), an Islamic "holy man" in the Maghreb
Al-Mourabitoun, a Lebanese political movement founded in 1957 
Murabitun World Movement, an Islamic movement founded in the 1980s
Al-Mourabitoun (militant group), an African Islamist group formed in 2013
Murabitat, political activists at the Temple Mount in Jerusalem

See also
Ribat